Bar Aftab (also Romanized as Bar Āftāb; also known as Barāftābeh) is a village in Cham Chamal Rural District, Bisotun District, Harsin County, Kermanshah Province, Iran. At the 2006 census, its population was 136, in 34 families.

References 

Populated places in Harsin County